Filamchi Bhojpuri is a 24x7 linear broadcast channel specializing in Bhojpuri cinema.
Currently, the channel is available on DD Free Dish at LCN 46  and Airtel Digital TV. This channel can be watched without any subscription on DD Free dish.

See also
List of Bhojpuri-language television channels

References

Bhojpuri-language television
IN10 Media Network

Movie channels in India